Patrikeyevo is a rural locality (a village) in Golovinskoye Rural Settlement, Sudogodsky District, Vladimir Oblast, Russia. The population was 3 as of 2010. There are 3 streets.

Geography 
Patrikeyevo is located 17 km west of Sudogda (the district's administrative centre) by road. Kliny is the nearest rural locality.

References 

Rural localities in Sudogodsky District